Leopold Šťastný (23 May 191114 May 1996) was a Slovak football player and coach. He played and coached for ŠK Slovan Bratislava.

He played for both Czechoslovakia and Slovakia at international level.

References

External links
Profile

1911 births
1996 deaths
Slovak footballers
Czechoslovak footballers
Czechoslovakia international footballers
ŠK Slovan Bratislava players
ŠK Slovan Bratislava managers
Czechoslovak football managers
Slovak football managers
Austria national football team managers
Slovakia international footballers
Dual internationalists (football)
Expatriate football managers in Austria
FC Wacker Innsbruck managers
Association football defenders
People from Malacky District
Sportspeople from the Bratislava Region